Lofland is a surname of Norwegian origin. Notable people with the surname include:

Dana Lofland (born 1967), American professional golfer 
Jacob Lofland (born 1996), American actor
James R. Lofland (1823–1894), American lawyer and politician
John Lofland (disambiguation):
John Lofland (poet) (1798–1849), American poet and writer, known as the Milford Bard
John Lofland (sociologist) (born 1936), American sociologist, professor, and author

References

Surnames of Norwegian origin